The Shockley–Ramo theorem is a method for calculating the electric current induced by a charge moving in the vicinity of an electrode. Previously named simply the "Ramo Theorem",
the modified name was introduced by D.S. McGregor et al. in 1998 

to recognize the contributions of both Shockley and Ramo to understanding the influence of mobile charges in a radiation detector. The theorem appeared in William Shockley's 1938 paper titled "Currents to Conductors Induced by a Moving Point Charge" and in Simon Ramo's 1939 paper titled "Currents Induced by Electron Motion".
It is based on the concept that the current induced in the electrode is due to the instantaneous change of electrostatic flux lines that end on the electrode, rather than the amount of charge received by the electrode per second (net charge flow rate).

The Shockley–Ramo theorem states that the instantaneous current  induced on a given electrode due to the motion of a charge is given by:

where

 is the charge of the particle;

 is its instantaneous velocity; and

The theorem has been applied to a wide variety of applications and fields, including semiconductor radiation detection, calculations of charge movement in proteins., or the detection of moving ions in vacuum for mass spectrometry or ion implantation.

References

External links
J. H. Jeans, "Electricity and Magnetism," page 160, Cambridge, London, English (1927) – Green's Theorem as Simon Ramo used it to derive his theorem.
 Introduction to Radiation Detectors and Electronics – Lecture Notes by Helmuth Spieler which briefly discuss Ramo's Theorem.

Physics theorems
Electromagnetism